Pantin is a commune in the northeastern suburbs of Paris, France.

Pantin may also refer to:

Pantin (Paris RER), a railway station in Pantin
Pantin (surname)
Pantin, an alternative name for the Nebbiolo wine grape variety

See also
 Panten, a municipality in the district of Lauenburg, in Schleswig-Holstein, Germany.
 Pantaenus, a Greek theologian and a significant figure in the Catechetical School of Alexandria from around AD 180.